Teenage Mom: The Series (The Series) is a 2017 Thai television series starring Perawat Sangpotirat (Krist) and Ramida Jiranorraphat (Jane).

Directed by Weerachit Thongjila and produced by GMMTV together with Housestories 8, the series was one of the six television series for 2017 showcased by GMMTV in their "6 Natures+" event on 2 March 2017. It premiered on LINE TV on 19 August 2017, airing on Saturdays at 19:00 ICT. The series concluded on 7 October 2017.

The series was rerun on One31 on 19 February 2018, airing on Mondays at 22:45 ICT and currently on GMM 25 airing on Fridays at 22:30 ICT.

Cast and characters 
Below are the cast of the series:

Main 
 Perawat Sangpotirat (Krist) as Mek
 Ramida Jiranorraphat (Jane) as Fah

Supporting 
 Rachwin Wongviriya (Koy) as Jane
 Supakan Benjaarruk (Nok) as Khing
 Apichaya Saejung (Ciize) as Mint
 Penpak Sirikul (Tai) as Mek's mother
 Sakuntala Teinpairoj (TonHorm) as Nop
 Pornnappan Pornpenpipat (Nene) as Fon

Guest role 
 Atthaphan Phunsawat (Gun) as a dentist
 Jumpol Adulkittiporn (Off) as a dentist assistant
 Puttichai Kasetsin (Push) as DJ Putt
 Chaleumpol Tikumpornteerawong (Jack) as Pose
 Prachaya Ruangroj (Singto) as a hospital visitor
 Niti Chaichitathorn (Pompam) as a pharmacist
 Watchara Sukchum (Jennie) as a party girl (Ep. 4)
 Boriboon Chanrueng as an air conditioning technician
 Nalin Hohler as a nurse

Soundtrack

References

External links 
 Teenage Mom: The Series on GMM 25 website 
 Teenage Mom: The Series on LINE TV
 GMMTV

Television series by GMMTV
Thai romance television series
Thai drama television series
2017 Thai television series debuts
2017 Thai television series endings
Television series by Housestories 8
Line TV original programming